Amparo is a 2021 Colombian drama film directed by Simón Mesa Soto and starring Sandra Melissa Torres, Diego Alejandro Tobón, Luciana Gallego, John Jairo Montoya and Adriana Vergara. Before arriving in Colombian theaters, the film participated in several international events like the Cannes, Chicago, Punta el Este and Lima film festivals, where it received awards and nominations.

Plot 
Elías, Amparo's eldest son, has just come of age and is eligible for compulsory military service, at a time when Colombia is immersed in a deep armed conflict and in a remote region where there seems to be no God and no law. Amparo knows that it is very likely that her son will not survive, and she begins to look for all kinds of solutions to save Elías from that fate. But there is a problem: Amparo only has one day to do it.

Cast 

 Sandra Melissa Torres is Amparo
 Diego Alejandro Tobón is Elías
 John Jairo Montoya is Víctor
 Luciana Gallego is Karen
 Adriana Vergara is Lucía

Awards and nominations

References

External links 

 

2021 films
2020s Spanish-language films
Colombian drama films
2021 drama films
2020s Colombian films